Stephen Bruce Bromhead ( – 16 March 2023) was an Australian politician who was a member of the New South Wales Legislative Assembly, representing Myall Lakes for the Nationals from 26 March 2011 until his death in 2023.

Early years and background
Bromhead was a registered nurse with two certificates, commencing work initially as a nurse. He later joined the New South Wales Police Force, serving initially as a general duties officer and then as a detective; serving for a total of 12 years in the majority around Taree and surrounding districts. Whilst working as a police officer, Bromhead studied law by correspondence and was admitted as a solicitor. He had subsequently studied and completed his Masters of Law through the University of New South Wales specialising in corporate, commercial and taxation law.

Bromhead had served as a Councillor on the Greater Taree City Council and had extensive community involvement including local rugby union football clubs, tourism associations, chambers of commerce, and horse racing clubs.

Political career
Following an earlier announcement that the Nationals' sitting member, John Turner would not be seeking re-election, Bromhead was endorsed by the National Party as the candidate in June 2010. During the last two weeks of the election campaign, Bromhead was involved in a motor vehicle accident where it was reported that he fractured his leg. The leg was fractured again in September 2011 when Bromhead jumped up to ask a question during question time in parliament.

At the March 2011 elections, Bromhead was elected and received a swing toward him of 11.2% after preferences in the traditionally strong Nationals seat, winning 78.6% of the vote on a two-party preferred basis.

At the March 2015 elections, Bromhead was re-elected.

In October 2022, Bromhead announced he would retire and not contest the 2023 New South Wales state election as he had been diagnosed with mesothelioma. He died on 16 March 2023, at the age of 66.

References

External links
 Stephen Bromhead - campaign website
 Bromhead Legal - Solicitors

1950s births
Year of birth uncertain
2023 deaths
Members of the New South Wales Legislative Assembly
National Party of Australia members of the Parliament of New South Wales
University of New South Wales Law School alumni
Australian police officers
Australian nurses
Australian solicitors
21st-century Australian politicians
Deaths from mesothelioma